Dr. RN Shetty Stadium is a multi-purpose stadium in Dharwad, Karnataka, India. Due to its proximity to Jubilee Circle, Karnatak College Dharwar, Karnataka University Dharwad, and St. Joseph's High School - the stadium is popular among various educational institutions of Dharwad and the ground is mainly used for organizing matches of football, field hockey and other sports. The stadium has hosted a Ranji Trophy match in 1990 when Karnataka cricket team played against Hyderabad cricket team. This was only time the stadium hosted a cricket match.

It is the usual venue of Karnataka Rajyotsava and Independence Day celebrations in Dharwad, where students of prominent schools & colleges in Dharwad perform various celebratory activities like singing patriotic songs, dancing, etc.

Renovation work started to build a 400-metre synthetic track in 2012.

References

External links 
 cricketarchive
 cricinfo

1949 establishments in India
Cricket grounds in Karnataka
Defunct cricket grounds in India
Buildings and structures in Hubli-Dharwad
Sports venues completed in 1949
20th-century architecture in India